Ray Anthony Fry (born April 17, 1989), better known under the stage name Widow Von'Du (or Widow Von Du), is an American drag performer known for competing on the twelfth season of RuPaul's Drag Race. He has since released an album.

Career 
Fry has won the title of Queen of KC at Kansas City Pridefest and Princess of Gay Pride 2008. He created the local "Drag Survivor" competition at Hamburger Mary's KC.

After unsuccessfully auditioning for season 11, Widow Von'Du was announced as a cast member on season 12 of RuPaul's Drag Race on January 23, 2020.

In September 2020, he was featured alongside many other Black RuPaul's Drag Race alum in a "Stop the Racism" PSA, speaking out against toxic, racist fans within the Drag Race community.

Personal life 
Fry took capoeira for six years prior to doing drag. He was homeless for a year.

On May 31, 2021, Fry was arrested in Jackson County, Missouri, for assaulting his partner. Reports said Fry punched his partner and knocked him out. Fry was charged with one count of domestic assault in the first degree and three counts of domestic assault in the second degree.  Fry is currently serving probation of three years per Missouri court database records.

Filmography

Television

Music videos

Featured and cameo roles

Web series

Discography

Albums

Singles

As lead artist

As featured artist

Guest appearances

References

External links
 

Living people
1989 births
African-American drag queens
Widow Von'Du